Arba was a settlement somewhere in northern Achaea, Ancient Greece. Pausanias mentioned it was a refuge for Patrinos during the Achaean War.

References

Populated places in ancient Achaea
Former populated places in Greece
Lost ancient cities and towns